Events in the year 2018 in Barbados.

Incumbents
Monarch: Elizabeth II
 Governor-General: Philip Greaves (until 8 January), Sandra Mason (starting 8 January)
 Prime Minister: Freundel Stuart (until 25 May), Mia Mottley (starting 25 May)

Events

Deaths

References

 
2010s in Barbados
Years of the 21st century in Barbados
Barbados
Barbados